Hannington is a village and civil parish in Wiltshire, England, two miles northwest of Highworth, and now part of the Borough of Swindon. The parish includes the hamlets of Hannington Wick (north of Hannington village) and Swanborough (south, on the border with Highworth parish). The nearest town is Swindon 5.5 miles (9.2 kilometres) and the County town of Wilshire, Trowbridge, is 29.5 miles (47.6 kilometres). The River Thames forms both the northern boundary of the parish and the county boundary with Gloucestershire.

John Marius Wilson of the Imperial Gazetteer of England and Wales in 1870 described the village of Hannington as:A village and a parish in Highworth district, Wilts. The village stands 2 miles W by N of Highworth, 2 S of the river Thames at the boundary with Gloucester, and 7 NE of Swindon Junction r. station; is a pretty place, built in the form of the letter Y; and has a post office under Swindon.

Demographics

Population 
The parish of Hannington has a population of 240 127 males and 113 females according to the most recent census data (2011). At the height of the village's population in 1881 433 people lived in Hannington. However, since the industrial revolution that boomed in cities, such as nearby Swindon the population has steadily declined. Since 1940's the villages population has plateaued at 250 mark; in last 130 years the population has all but halved.

Occupations 
The occupation for the village as of 1881 are shown in the graph (left), these have been divided into male and female with designated colours. Occupations at the time of the 1881 census were dominated by agriculture with 46 people; with the vast majority being male. Domestics services were all but exclusive to women due to the culture and the views of time. Census data in 1881 was recorded by the local priest or tax collector, many at the time were unemployed or carried out illegal activities.

Hannington Hall 
Hannington Hall is a Grade II* listed country house built in 1653. Hannington Hall has been a centre piece of the village since Sir Thomas Freke commissioned and paid for the construction. The Land and surrounding parsonages had been in the family name since 1603. The grounds of hall are still dotted with buildings associated to the running of the estate. Structures as Victorian stable block (Grade II* listed)

St John the Baptist 
St John the Baptist Church is the only religious building located in the local area, serving the population of Lushill and Cannington Wick as well as Hannington. However the church was originally named after Saint David and remains on the site point to a previous church building being situated on the land.

Transport 

The minor road running through the village connects to the B4019 Blunsdon-Highworth road to the south, giving access to the M4 motorway via the A419. The road north through Hannington Wick continues to Kempsford, and another minor road leads northwest to Castle Eaton.

The village has been without access to the rail network since 1962 when the Highworth branch line closed following declining passenger numbers.

Public Houses 
Hannington's local inn is the Jolly Tar.  However alternate pubs such as The Freke Arms are also situated in the parish. The Freke Family of Hannington built the pub in the early 19th century.

Notable people
 Thomas Freke (1660–1721)

References

External links
Hannington at genuki.org.uk

Villages in Wiltshire
Civil parishes in Wiltshire
Borough of Swindon